Breage is a civil parish and village in Cornwall, United Kingdom. The village is three miles (5 km) west of Helston.

Other settlements in the parish include the villages of Ashton, Carleen and Godolphin Cross; the coastal village of Praa Sands; and the Great Work Mine. The ward population at the Census 2011 had increased to 4,757. Breage civil parish had a population increase to 3181.

Breage is named after Saint Breaca, a missionary from Ireland (to whom the 15th-century church is dedicated) and it is in the former Kerrier District.

History
The parish was at the time of Domesday Book within the manor of Binnerton. There were 8 hides of land with enough for 60 ploughs. There were 32 villagers and 25 smallholders with 15 ploughs between them. Livestock were 45 mares, 13 cattle, 5 pigs and 60 sheep; the annual value was £10.

There are two Cornish crosses in the parish: one which was found buried in the churchyard now stands near the south porch; Trevena cross stands at a road junction about half a mile north of the churchtown.

Governance
Breage has a parish council, the lowest level of local government.  It is in the unitary authority of Cornwall Council, and the parliamentary constituency of St Ives, represented since the  2015 general election by Derek Thomas (Conservative).

Geography
The geological formation known as the Tregonning-Godolphin Granite (one of five granite batholiths in Cornwall) underlies the parish and the area was formerly an important source of tin and copper ore (see Geology of Cornwall). The area has evidence of habitation and mining for the past two millennia. Other than Praa Sands, the villages in the parish were tin and copper mining villages. Breage itself was where the mine owners (or captains) lived as evidenced by the number of fine buildings in the village. The village water pump (presumably now disconnected) still stands today as a relic of the past. Most of today's working population are commuters, travelling to Helston, RNAS Culdrose, Porthleven, Penzance, Falmouth or even further afield. Some residents are still involved in farming or smallholding in the surrounding area. Ashton is at : it is situated on the A394 Penzance-Helston road one mile (1.6 km) north of Praa Sands. Ashton has a pub called the Lion and Lamb and at one time had a football team.

The following villages and hamlets are in the parish: Ashton; Broadlane; Carleen; Godolphin Cross; Gwedna; Hendra; Kenneggy; Millpool; Pengersick; Penhale Jakes; Polladras; Praa Sands; Rinsey; Rinsey Croft; Trenwheal; Trescowe; Tresoweshill; Trevena; and Trew.

Protected areas
Tregonning Hill, to the west of the parish, was designated a Site of Special Scientific Interest (SSSI) in 1994 for its biological interest. Tremearne Par SSSI and Porthcew SSSI, along the coast west of Porthleven, were designated for their geological interest and are also Geological Conservation Review (GCR) sites. Great Wheal Fortune was a small mine in operation between 1855 and 1880 and produced 2992 tons of tin, 322 tons of copper and some arsenic and tungsten. In 1991 it was designated a SSSI and is also a GCR site of national importance.

Parish church and church school

The church was built of granite in the 15th century: on the north wall are five medieval wall paintings. A Roman milestone of the 3rd century is preserved in the church and in the churchyard there is an unusual Hiberno-Saxon cross head. The inscription on the milestone is: IMP [C] DO NO MARC CASSI: this incomplete text refers to the Emperor (Marcus Cassianus) Postumus, 258–68 AD (Collingwood, RIB no. 2232).

There is also a Methodist church in the village known as Breaney Methodist chapel which is on Trevithick road.

The local primary school is Breage Church of England VA Primary School established in the 1840s.

Notable people
 Sidney Godolphin, the Cavalier poet and courtier, was baptised in Breage.
 Major-General David Tyacke, the last Commanding Officer of the Duke of Cornwall's Light Infantry was born and buried in Breage, where his family had been involved in tin-mining since the early 18th century.

References

External links

Civil parishes in Cornwall
Sites of Special Scientific Interest in Cornwall
Villages in Cornwall